Shoot Boxing World Tournament 1995 or S-Cup 1995 was a shoot boxing event promoted by Caesar Takeshi.  It was the inaugural (70kg/154lbs weight class) Shoot Boxing World Tournament, featuring an eight single elimination format, fought under Shoot Boxing Rules.  In total there were eight fighters at the event, representing five countries.  The tournament winner was Hiromu Yoshitaka who defeated Ron Belliveau in the final.  The event was held at the Osaka Prefectural Gymnasium on Wednesday, 31 January 1995.

Shoot Boxing World Tournament 1995

Results

See also
List of male kickboxers

References

Shoot boxing events
1995 in kickboxing
Kickboxing in Japan
Sport in Osaka